Quasimitra rubrolaterculus is a species of sea snail, a marine gastropod mollusk in the family Mitridae, the miters or miter snails.

Distribution
This marine species occurs off Natal, South Africa.

References

 Aiken R. & Seccombe A. (2019). Five new Gastropoda (Casmaria, Sassia, Kilburnia, Quasimitra and Calliostoma) from the eastern seaboard of southern Africa and a revision of Mitra boswellae. The Festivus. 51(3): 198-217

External links
 

rubrolaterculus
Gastropods described in 2019